Coteau station is located on Daoust Street in the town of Les Coteaux, Quebec, Canada. It is an optional stop on the Via Rail Ottawa-Montreal Corridor line. The station is unmanned and is wheelchair-accessible.

Railway services
As of early May 2020, Coteau station is served by one domestic route (with connections). Departures have been reduced to one per day in either direction due to the coronavirus pandemic (effective March 31, 2020).

References

External links

Via Rail stations in Quebec
Railway stations in Montérégie
Canadian National Railway stations in Quebec
Rail transport in Vaudreuil-Soulanges Regional County Municipality